Stuart K. Spencer (born 20 February 1927) is an American political consultant. As co-founder of Spencer-Roberts, he and his firm have managed over 400 Republican political campaigns.

Stuart Spencer served in the United States Navy from 1945 to 1946, and then graduated from the East Los Angeles Junior College with an AA, and from California State University, Los Angeles, with a BA degree in Sociology in 1951.

Spencer-Roberts & Associates, Inc., was established in California in 1961 with Bill Roberts. They were among the first professional campaign managers.  In 1962 he managed Tom Kuchel's campaign for United States Senate in California.  After that, he managed Nelson Rockefeller's presidential campaign of 1964, and Don Riegle's run for Congress, Michigan, in 1966.

He ran Ronald Reagan's gubernatorial campaign in California in 1966. That year, Reagan told Spencer that "Politics is just like show business. You have a hell of an opening, coast for a while, and then have a hell of a close." He also ran Reagan's gubernatorial campaign in 1970, and his presidential campaigns in 1980 and 1984.

Stuart Spencer became the sole owner of Spencer-Roberts in 1974. In 1976 he served as Deputy Chairman for Political Organization in Gerald Ford's presidential re-election campaign. When he served as Reagan's campaign manager in 1980, he suggested that he choose George H. W. Bush as his running mate, but later recounted that Reagan wasn't keen to the idea, apparently because Reagan didn't like Bush. "There was no way he was going to pick Bush," said Spencer. "It was chemistry."

In 1985, his firm allegedly received over $350,000 to run the Panamanian presidential campaign of Eric Delvalle,
and in 1988 he was assigned to improve Dan Quayle's image. In October of that year he remarked on the difficulty of the task, saying "First we had to shut that John Birch father of his up, and then the National Guard thing hit."

Karen Spencer joined Spencer-Roberts in 1989 and expanded the firm's roles into public policy, avocation, and political strategic planning. She registered as a California state lobbyist and as a federal lobbyist in Washington, DC.

Stuart Spencer has had a long friendship with Dick Cheney, having worked with him as far back as the Ford administration. In 1993, he speculated that Cheney would seek the presidency in 1996.  He told "Human Events" magazine, "Look, I'm pro-choice and Dick is pro-life but I'm for him if he runs. He's like a brother to me."

Spencer voted for Democrat Joe Biden over Republican incumbent Donald Trump in the 2020 election, the first Democrat he supported since Harry Truman in the 1948 election.

References

External links

Los Angeles Times profile of Stuart Spencer and his role in the 2020 elections.

1927 births
Living people
American political consultants
California Republicans
California State University, Los Angeles alumni
United States Navy sailors